A work accident, workplace accident, occupational accident, or accident at work is a "discrete occurrence in the course of work" leading to physical or mental occupational injury. According to the International Labour Organization (ILO), more than 337 million accidents happen on the job each year, resulting, together with occupational diseases, in more than 2.3 million deaths annually.

The phrase "in the course of work" can include work-related accidents happening off the company's premises, and can include accidents caused by third parties, according to Eurostat. The definition of work accident includes accidents occurring "while engaged in an economic activity, or at work, or carrying on the business of the employer" according to the ILO.

The phrase "physical or mental harm" means any injury, disease, or death. Occupational accidents differ from occupational diseases as accidents are unexpected and unplanned occurrences (e.g., mine collapse), while occupational diseases are "contracted as a result of an exposure over a period of time to risk factors arising from work activity" (e.g., miner's lung).

Incidents that fall within the definition of occupational accidents include cases of acute poisoning, attacks by humans and animals, insects etc., slips and falls on pavements or staircases, traffic collisions, and accidents on board means of transportation in the course of work, accidents in airports, stations and so on.

There is no consensus as to whether commuting accidents (i.e. accidents on the way to work and while returning home after work) should be considered to be work accidents. The ESAW methodology excludes them; the ILO includes them in its conventions concerning health & safety at work, although it lists them as a separate category of accidents; and some countries (e.g., Greece) do not distinguish them from other work accidents.

A fatal accident at work is defined as an accident which leads to the death of a victim. The time within which the death may occur varies among countries: in Netherlands an accident is registered as fatal if the victim dies during the same day that the accident happened, in Germany if death came within 30 days, while Belgium, France and Greece set no time limit.

Where the accidents involve multiple fatalities, they are often referred to as industrial disasters.

Types
Although many workplace accidents have relatively minor repercussions, which could result in just a paper cut or scratch, others can have more serious – and potentially fatal – consequences.

For instance, there are some industries in which individuals are more exposed to occupational hazards than others, such as the construction trade. This had the highest rate of fatal injuries out of all other industry sections in 2011/12. During this period, falls accounted for 51% of construction injuries resulting in death, demonstrating that builders are more likely to fall from height than those who work in less dangerous locations, such as an office.

An independent watchdog – the Health and Safety Executive (HSE) – aims to reduce the number of work-related fatalities and injuries within Great Britain, publishing statistics that show the different – and most common – types of reported workplace injuries across a range of sectors.

For example, the HSE reported that, between 2011 and 2012, incidents such as falls from height, becoming trapped by a falling structure, and being struck by a vehicle or moving object, were the reasons for the majority of fatalities to British workers.

It was also revealed that slips, trips or falls were responsible for more than 50% of serious injuries to employees. Furthermore, the majority of incidents that resulted in employees taking more than three days off work – or affected their ability to perform their usual duties over this period – were caused by handling accidents.

Although some accidents at work can have minor effects, the HSE statistics revealed that more than 27 million working days were lost between 2011 and 2012 due to occupational illness or personal injury, proving that these incidents can have serious repercussions. In 2019, construction employment climbed to 11.4 million workers. There are online guides that provide information on how to deal with an injury at work.  In 2019, construction employment climbed to 11.4 million workers.

Causal factors

Accidents arise from unsafe behavior and/or unsafe conditions. An important factor is the safety climate or safety culture of an organization. Safety culture concerns how workplace safety is managed, consisting of the shared attitudes, beliefs, perceptions, and values among employees. Faulty equipment can also cause serious personal injuries, a common example being accidents from faulty ladders. If the rubber feet are absent, the base of the aluminium stile can slip suddenly on a hard floor and the user can fall.

Benefits of prevention

According to the Health and Safety Executive, employers who implement suitable measures to prevent accidents in the workplace could reap a number of benefits. As well as reducing the number of injuries at work, managers could also:

Be less likely to suffer legal action
Acquire a better reputation amongst partners, investors, customers and suppliers
Have employees who feel more motivated, demonstrating greater productivity
Reduce costs
Have reduced employee turnover and absence rates. It has been reported that over 2,000,000 working days each year are lost due to handling accidents and slips and trips alone. In Argentina, the work accident rate in the year 2018 decreased 10% from the previous year.

Examples
During the 2015 shooting of the movie Resident Evil: The Final Chapter, stuntwoman Olivia Jackson had her arm amputated
after her motorbike crashed to a metal camera arm during a high-speed chase
.

Matilda Rapaport died from an avalanche while filming an advertisement for the 2016 video game Steep.

See also
Forensic engineering
Health and Safety Executive
National Safety Council
Occupational injury
Occupational disease
Occupational health psychology
Personal injury
Social security
Workers' compensation
 Workers' Memorial Day

References

 
Occupational safety and health